Nascent Republic Records is an independent record label founded in 2008 by Josh Seawell, owner of Seawell Studios near Greensboro, North Carolina. The label was formed to give recording freedom to the artists without the pressure of someone telling them they had to sound a certain way.  There are four artists on the roster: Joey Barnes (formerly of Daughtry, 2006–2010), Patrick Rock, Stephen von Heyking, and Courtney Smith. Former artist J Timber was signed to the label from 2010 to 2011.

Discography 
Always by Joey Barnes - March 2009
When All Else Fails... by Patrick Rock- March 2009
Last Request by Joey Barnes - June 2009
Change by Joey Barnes - November 2009
Self-Titled by J Timber- May 2010
Lips that Taste of Tears by Courtney Smith- November 2010
Last Christmas by Joey Barnes - December 2010

Music videos

References

External links 
 www.nascentrepublic.com

American independent record labels
Companies based in North Carolina
Record labels established in 2008